Dark Shades of Blue is the fifth studio album by Australian multi-instrumentalist Xavier Rudd, which was released on 16 August 2008. It peaked at No. 5 on the ARIA Albums Chart.

Track listing

Personnel
Joe Barresi – mixing
Carmel Echols – choir, chorus
Rob Giles – choir, chorus
Jimmy Hoyson – engineer, vocal engineer
Clydene Jackson – choir, chorus
James Looker – engineer, production assistant, photography, instrument technician
Gavin Lurssen – mastering
Anthony Lycenko – assistant engineer
Banula Marika – vocals, vocals (background)
Xavier Rudd – organ, guitar (acoustic), bass, guitar (electric), vocals, producer, slide guitar, stomp box, guitar (12-string acoustic)
Paul "Scooby" Smith – assistant engineer
Oren Waters – choir, chorus
Wil Wheaton – choir, chorus
Maxine Willard – Waters choir, chorus

Charts

References

2008 albums
Xavier Rudd albums